The 1992 Currie Cup (known as the Bankfin Currie Cup for sponsorship reasons) was the top division of the Currie Cup competition, the premier domestic rugby union competition in South Africa. This was the 54th season since the competition started in 1889.

Teams

Changes between 1991 and 1992 seasons
 None

Changes between 1992 and 1993 seasons
 None

Competition

There were six participating teams in the 1992 Currie Cup. These teams played each other twice over the course of the season, once at home and once away. Teams received two points for a win and one points for a draw. The top two teams qualified for the final.

In addition, all the Currie Cup teams also played in the 1992 Currie Cup / Central Series.

Log

Fixtures and results

Round one

Round two

Round three

Round four

Round five

Round six

Round seven

Round eight

Round nine

Round ten

Round eleven

Round twelve

Round thirteen

Round fourteen

Final

See also
 1992 Currie Cup / Central Series
 1992 Currie Cup Central A
 1992 Currie Cup Central B
 1992 Currie Cup Central / Rural Series
 1992 Currie Cup Rural A & B
 1992 Currie Cup Rural B
 1992 Lion Cup

External links

References

 
Currie Cup
Currie